= Panteón 5 de Diciembre =

Cemetery in Puerto Vallarta, Jalisco, Mexico

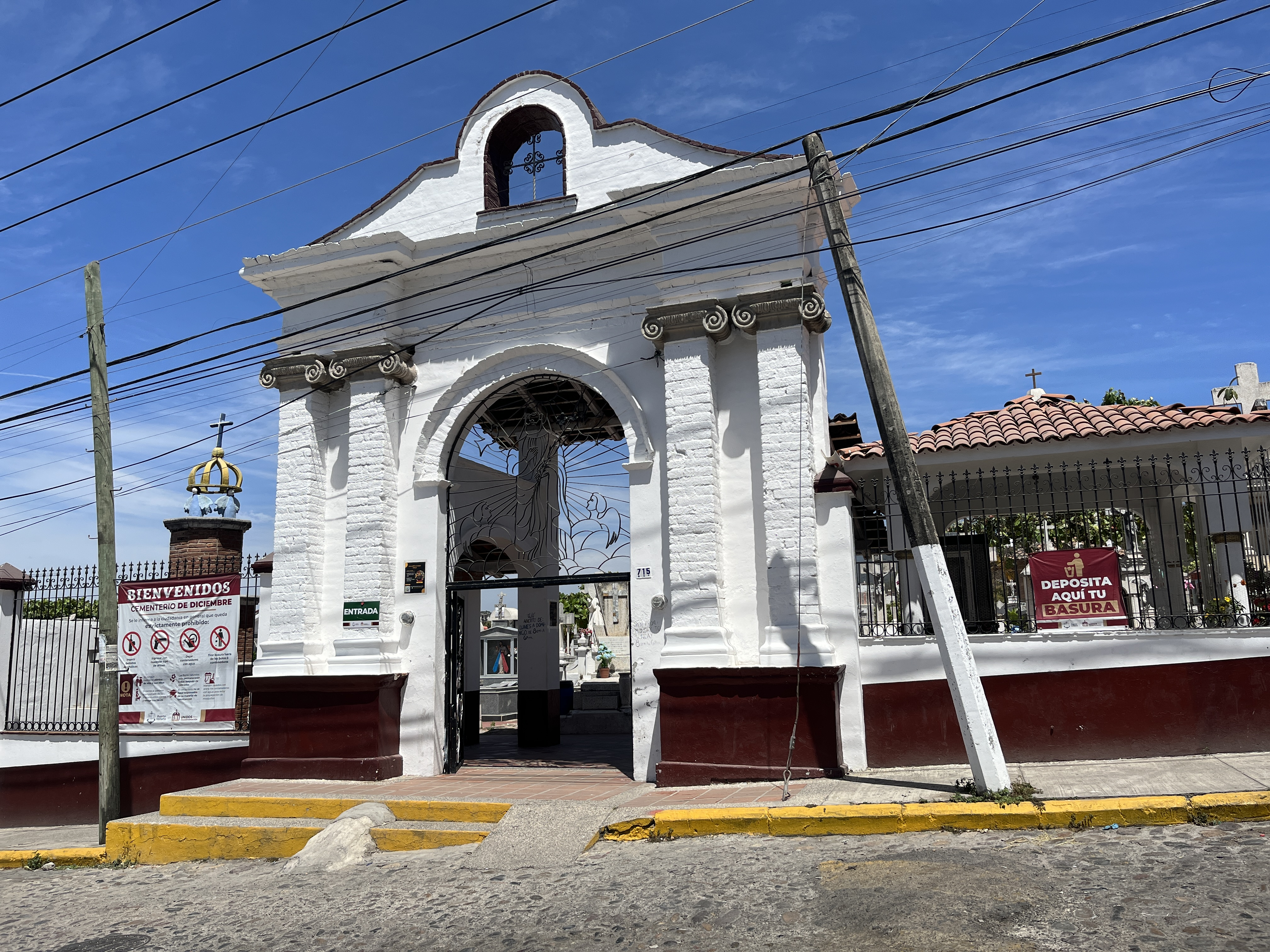
- Entrance, 2023

Details
- Location: Puerto Vallarta, Jalisco
- Country: Mexico
- Coordinates: 20.6198°N 105.2247°W

Panteón 5 de Diciembre is a cemetery in Puerto Vallarta, in the Mexican state of Jalisco.
